1975 college football season may refer to:

 1975 NCAA Division I football season
 1975 NCAA Division II football season
 1975 NCAA Division III football season
 1975 NAIA Division I football season
 1975 NAIA Division II football season